The Sabine Islands (Norwegian: Sabineøyane) are a group of islands at the northern side of Nordaustlandet, Svalbard. They are located south of Scoresbyøya, in the bay of Sabinebukta. The islands are named after Arctic explorer Edward Sabine. The most northern island has a length of about 1.5 kilometers and is the largest of the islands.

References

Islands of Svalbard